A heptose is a monosaccharide with seven carbon atoms.

They have either an aldehyde functional group in position 1 (aldoheptoses)  or a ketone functional group in position 2, 3 or 4 (ketoheptoses). Ketoheptoses have 4 chiral centers, whereas aldoheptoses have 5.

Examples
There are few examples of seven-carbon sugars in nature, among which are:
 sedoheptulose or D-altro-heptulose (a ketose), an intermediate in the Calvin cycle and in lipid A biosynthesis
 mannoheptulose (a ketose), found in avocadoes
 L-glycero-D-manno-heptose (an aldose), a late intermediate in lipid A biosynthesis.

References